This Is the Third Album of a Band Called Adebisi Shank is the third studio album by Irish math rock band Adebisi Shank. It was released on 12 August 2014 through Sargent House.

Track listing

References

2014 albums
Adebisi Shank albums